Mandya University  is located in Mandya, Karnataka, India.

References

Universities and colleges in Mandya district
2019 establishments in Karnataka
Universities in Karnataka
Public universities in India
Educational institutions established in 2019